The Fayetteville Marksmen are a professional minor league ice hockey team based in Fayetteville, North Carolina. They currently play in the Southern Professional Hockey League (SPHL) and play their home games in the Crown Coliseum.

The team, originally known as the Fayetteville force then the Cape Fear FireAntz, began play in the Atlantic Coast Hockey League in the 2002–03 season. After the league's collapse, they joined the South East Hockey League for the 2003–04 season and then what would become the SPHL in 2004 as the Fayetteville FireAntz. Since their inception, they have won the 2007 SPHL championship and made a number of playoff appearances.

Due to the effects of the COVID-19 pandemic, the Marksmen are one of several SPHL teams to not participate in the 2020–21 season.

History

ACHL and SEHL years
The team, then known as the Cape Fear FireAntz, joined the fledgling Atlantic Coast Hockey League for the 2002–03 season. Their first coach was Shawn Ulrich. After the season David Waronker announced he was withdrawing his four teams from the unstable league to form the World Hockey Association 2. The FireAntz and other remaining ACHL teams formed the South East Hockey League. They played the SEHL for the 2003–04 season, with Scott Rex serving as coach.

SPHL

Fayetteville FireAntz

In 2004, teams from the SEHL and WHA2 joined together to form the league now known as the Southern Professional Hockey League. The FireAntz joined the new league, changing their name to Fayetteville FireAntz, abandoning the reference to the nearby Cape Fear River. Derek Booth took over as head coach in 2004 and after two seasons behind the bench, he left to coach the Bloomington Prairie Thunder of the United Hockey League.

In the 2006–07 season, under the guidance of head coach John Marks, the FireAntz advanced to the finals of the league's post-season playoffs for the first time in team history.  The first two games of the best-of-five finals were won by Fayetteville on the FireAntz' home ice, before the series returned to Jacksonville, Florida, where the Jacksonville Barracudas won game three of the series by a 3–2 score. The FireAntz won the fourth game of the series by a score of 5–3 to win the President's Cup.  It was the first championship for the FireAntz, and Fayetteville's first professional sports championship in 51 years. Head coach Marks resigned after the team's championship run to take the head coach position with the Pensacola Ice Pilots of the ECHL. Shortly after Marks' resignation the FireAntz announced that former Florida Seals coach, Tommy Stewart, had been hired to coach the team for the 2007–2008 season.

Tommy Stewart was let go after the 2010–11 season and was soon replaced by Rio Grande Valley Killer Bees' assistant coach, Sean Gillam. Gillam would only last partway through the season; on February 17, 2012, the FireAntz replaced him with Todd Bidner.

Mark DeSantis was hired prior to the 2012–13 season. He led the team to regular season record in the league and won William B. Coffey Trophy and the SPHL's Coach of the Year. However, he left the team after only one season to become the head coach of an expansion team in his hometown, the Brampton Beast.

Greg McCauley was then hired to replace DeSantis for the 2013–14 season but resigned for personal reasons after 32 games. He was replaced by Emery Olauson, who was then kept on until the end of the 2014–15 season.

On May 26, 2015, Jeff Bes was hired as the head coach prior to the 2015–16 season.

Fayetteville Marksmen
On February 13, 2017, Jeffrey M. Longo was hired as the general manager. Later in the 2016–17 season, Longo and local entrepreneur Chuck Norris purchased the FireAntz from the seven-person ownership group, Cape Fear Pro Hockey. At the end of the season, the new owners changed the name of the FireAntz to the Fayetteville Marksmen. The change reflects the city of Fayetteville's relationship with the local United States Army post, Fort Bragg, as well as the native Carolina red fox.

In June 2017, head coach Jeff Bes decided to not re-sign with the team to be closer to his family. He was replaced by Nick Mazzolini but only lasted until November 23 when he was replaced by Phil Esposito, the recent head coach of the Watertown Wolves. Esposito would also last less than a season and was relieved of duties on February 21, 2018, after a 5–19–4 record and in last place in the SPHL. John Bierchen took over as head coach on an interim basis for the remainder of the season.

The Marksmen then hired Jesse Kallechy as the permanent head coach for the 2018–19 season where the Marksmen finished the season with the final playoff spot. In the 2019–20 season, Kallechy had led the team to competing for the President's Trophy for the regular season championship until the season was curtailed by the onset of the COVID-19 pandemic in March 2020. Kallechy win the 2020 SPHL Coach of the Year and was then hired by the Florida Everblades in the ECHL as an assistant coach. Kellechy was replaced by Marksmen assistant coach Cory Melkert during the 2020 offseason. The Marksmen were then one of five SPHL teams to opt out of participating in the 2020–21 pandemic-delayed season due to capacity restrictions at their home arena.

Championships

Honors

References

External links 
Fayetteville Marksmen
Southern Professional Hockey League
PointStreak

Southern Professional Hockey League teams
Ice hockey teams in North Carolina
Sports in Fayetteville, North Carolina
Ice hockey clubs established in 2002
2002 establishments in North Carolina